Tom Okker and Marty Riessen won the title, defeating John Newcombe and Tony Roche 8–6, 6–4 in the final.

Seeds

  John Newcombe /  Tony Roche (final)
  Robert Lutz /  Stan Smith (quarterfinals)

Draw

Draw

References
Draw

U.S. Pro Indoor